Ikaw Ay Akin is a 1978 Filipino romantic drama film directed by Ishmael Bernal. Written by Bernal and Jose N. Carreon, it tells a story about a man's guilt over his affair with another woman that hurt the feelings of his long time girlfriend. It stars Vilma Santos, Nora Aunor, and Christopher de Leon in leading roles, and also had pre-stardom actors in minor roles, like Rene Requiestas and Sandy Andolong, who would later become de Leon's wife.

The film also became famous for the experimental long shot scene of the reunion between Sandra and Tere, with the two confronting each other using only their eyes. It has since been known for popularizing the term "mata-mata (eye to eye) acting."

Ikaw Ay Akin has been digitally restored and remastered by the ABS-CBN Film Archives through the facilities of Central Digital Lab in Makati City, Metro Manila.

Cast

Vilma Santos as Sandra Aragon
Nora Aunor as Teresita 'Tere' Valdez
Christopher de Leon as Rex Aguilar
Nick Romano
Ellen Esguerra
Zandro Zamora
Odette Khan
Ven Medina
Ernie Zarate
Angel Confiado
Renato Requiestas
Ricky Rivero
Ogie Sanchez
Eddie Recto	
Joey Sison		
Cris Vertido		
Anton Juan		
Catherine Santos		
Charmie Benavidez		
Philippine Air Force Sky Diving Team		
Col. Apolonio de Jesus Jr.
Maj. Ed Calvo
Aida Carmona
Estrella Antonio		
Edgar Zabala	
William Tan		
Helen Plata
Louella Albornoz
Butch Borromeo	
Ricky Alvendia	
Ernie Plata		
Evelyn Vargas	
Sandy Andolong

Release
The film was first released on December 8, 1978, sixteen days before the 1978 Metro Manila Film Festival.

Digital restoration
The restored version was premiered on November 14, 2015, as part of the 2015 Cinema One Originals. The premiere was attended by the family of Ishmael Bernal; film screenwriter Jose Carreon; Mon Confiado (representing his late father), actor Junjun Quintana; one of the film's cast members Evelyn Vargas-Knaebel; former actress Cecille Castillo; vice head of the National Committee on Cinema, Teddy Co; Ricky Orellana, head of Mowelfund Audiovisual Archives; writers Mario A. Hernando and Raquel Villavicencio; and director Joyce Bernal. Myx VJ, Ai dela Cruz hosted the premiere event.

The restored version also received a free-to-air television premiere on ABS-CBN and its high-definition service on February 4, 2018, as a feature presentation for its Sunday late-night program, Sunday's Best. According to AGB Nielsen statistics, the showing received a nationwide rating of 1.1%, losing to GMA Network's showing of The Hangover: Part III, which received a nationwide rating of 2.4%.

Notes

References

External links

1978 films
1978 romantic drama films
Films set in Manila
Philippine romantic drama films
Filipino-language films
Films directed by Ishmael Bernal